is a Japanese R&B and pop singer.

History

2002–2003: Audition and success 
In April 2002, she won the 1st place on the audition called "Super Starlight Contest" brought by Giza Studio. After that, she appeared on some compilations like "GIZA studio MAI-K & FRIENDS HOTROD BEACH PARTY" and "DAY TRACK: Lady Mastersoul".

On July 2, 2003, she released her first single "Don't you wanna see me <oh> tonight?". It peaked at No. 35 on the Oricon Singles Chart and gained many radio plays.

On December 3, her debut studio album "CONTROL Your touch" was released.

2004: "Yumi Shizukusa II" 
On April 14, she released the lead single from her 2nd album "Yumi Shizukusa II", "Kokoro wa itsumo Rainbow Color". It achieved weak success, charting at No. 84 on the Oricon Singles Chart.

On October 27, 2004, she released her second studio album "Yumi Shizukusa II". It includes "I'm in Love" featuring Wyclef Jean.

2005–2006: Comeback in popularity and "Hana kagari" 
On February 9, 2005, she released her 6th single "Hana kagari". It was used in Japanese famous TV mystery drama "Kyoto Chiken no Onna" and gained many airplays.

On December 15, 2005, she released her 1st digital single "Communication break out" on iTunes. It peaked at No. 1 on the iTunes Chart.

On March 1, 2006, her third studio album "Hana Kagari" was released.

2007–2010: "I still believe" and duet with KG 
On May 30, 2007, she released her 8th single "I still believe: Tameiki". It was used in one of the most popular Japanese anime Case Closed and peaked at No. 50 on the Oricon Singles Chart.

On October 29, she released 10th single "GO YOUR OWN WAY". It performed moderate success with the usage in Case Closed.

Her 4th studio album "THE PAINTED SOUL" was released on December 3, 2008.

On August 19, 2009, she released her first extended play "ENDLESS SUMMER". It peaked at No. 1 on the iTunes R&B Albums Chart.

On February 24, she appeared on KG's album "Love for you" and sang "Kanawanai Koi demo" with him. This song gained moderate success on iTunes.

After that, she went silent about for 3 years.

2013–2014: Comeback in the music scene 
Her 5th studio album "A woman's heart" was released on December 18, 2013. It achieved weak success though it was praised from critics.

On June 11, she released her first compilation album "#10-story: best of Yumi Shizukusa". It includes two new songs.

2015–2017: "BLUE" and "Rouge" 
On July 22, 2015, she released her 6th studio album "BLUE", which was acclaimed by critics. It includes the song "Everytime", which was produced by a Grammy-nominated producer starRo. On Marc 22, 2017 she released her 7th studio album "Rouge".

2018-2021: First Art Exhibition and YouTube Live Stream 
On July 31, 2018, she provided music Wanna Be Loved for the image movie of the women's luxury brand "Elza Winkler". The song is available only through the official SoundCloud profile.

In October 2019, two paintings were officially exhibited at the art festival "Salon Art Shopping Paris" held at the Carrousel du Louvre in the Louvre Museum in Paris, France.

In November 2020, she held first YouTube live stream Atelier Music Room on the Being Inc.'s Official YouTube channel.

Since March 2021, her name disappeared from the Being's official website and her paintings are no longer available for the sale on the Being's portal site. There was no public announcement for hiatus neither retirement.

Discography

Studio albums

Extended plays

Compilation albums

Singles

Guest appearances

Filmography

References

External links 
 Official Website
 
 
 

1984 births
Being Inc. artists
Japanese women singer-songwriters
Japanese singer-songwriters
Japanese women pop singers
Living people
21st-century Japanese singers
21st-century Japanese women singers